The Roman Catholic Relief Act 1791 (31 George III, c. 32) is an Act of the Parliament of Great Britain passed in 1791 relieving Roman Catholics of certain political, educational, and economic disabilities. It admitted Catholics to the practice of law, permitted the exercise of their religion, and the existence of their schools. On the other hand, chapels, schools, officiating priests and teachers were to be registered, assemblies with locked doors, as well as steeples and bells to chapels, were forbidden; priests were not to wear vestments or celebrate liturgies in the open air; children of Protestants were not to be admitted to the schools; monastic orders and endowments of schools and colleges were prohibited.

The sentiment for reform was helped along by the signing of the Edict of Versailles in France in 1787, whereby non-Catholic French subjects were given full legal status in a kingdom where Catholicism had always been the state religion.

Terms
It was far more extensive and far-reaching than its predecessor, the Papists Act 1778. By it there was again an oath to be taken, in character much like that of 1778, but including an engagement to support the Protestant Succession under the Act of Settlement 1701.  No Catholic taking the oath was henceforward to be prosecuted for being a Papist, or for being educated in Catholicism, or for hearing Catholic Mass or saying it, or for being a priest or deacon or for entering into, or belonging to, any ecclesiastical order or community in the Church of Rome, or for assisting at, or performing any Catholic rites or ceremonies. Catholics were no longer to be summoned to take the Oath of Supremacy, or to be removed from London; the legislation of King George I, requiring them to register their estates and wills, was absolutely repealed; while the professions of counsellor and barrister at law, attorney, solicitor, and notary were opened to them.

It was however provided that all their assemblies for religious worship should be certified at Quarter Sessions; that no person should officiate at such assembly until his name had been recorded by the Clerk of the Peace: that no such place of assembly should be locked or barred during the meeting; and that the building in which it was held, should not have a steeple or bell. The Relief Act of 1791 undoubtedly marked a great step in the removal of Catholic grievances, but the English statesmen felt, along with the Catholic body, that much more was required. William Pitt the Younger and his rival, Charles James Fox, were alike pledged to a full measure of Catholic Emancipation, but they were both thwarted by the obstinacy of King George III, who insisted that to agree to any such measure would be a violation of his coronation oath.

There were also at this period considerable dissensions within the Catholic ranks. These concerned first the question of Veto on the appointment of bishops in Ireland, which it was proposed to confer on the English Government, and belongs chiefly to the history of Emancipation in that country. There was another cause of dissension, more properly English, which was connected with the adjuration of the supposed Catholic doctrines contained in the oath imposed upon those who wished to participate in the benefits conferred by the Act of 1791, as previously by that of 1778. The lay members of the Catholic committee who had framed this disclaimer were accused by the Vicars Apostolic, who then administered the Catholic Church in England, of tampering with matters of ecclesiastical discipline; and although the bishops had their way in the matter of the oath, the feud survived, and was proclaimed to the world by the formation in 1792 of the Cisalpine Club, the members whereof were pledged "to resist any ecclesiastical interference which may militate against the freedom of English Catholics".

The Irish Act of 1793
The Act was followed by the Roman Catholic Relief Act 1793, an Act of the Irish Parliament in 1793, with some local provisions such as allowing Catholics to vote in elections to the Irish House of Commons and to take degrees at Trinity College Dublin. Catholic schools had already been permitted again by the Irish Act of 1782, subject to the teachers taking the Oath of Allegiance and obtaining a license from the local Church of Ireland (Protestant) Bishop.

See also
 Catholic emancipation
 Toleration Act 1688
 Papists Act 1778
 Roman Catholic Relief Act 1829
 Places of Worship Registration Act 1855

References

Sources

Great Britain Acts of Parliament 1791
Christianity and law in the 18th century
1791 in Christianity
Law about religion in the United Kingdom
History of Catholicism in the United Kingdom